The Christ the King Cathedral  also called Niigata Church is a religious building that is affiliated with the Catholic Church and is located in the city of Niigata in the prefecture of the same name, in Japan.

The church was dedicated in 1927. It follows the Roman or Latin rite and is the principal church of the diocese of Niigata (Dioecesis Niigataënsis カトリック新潟教区) which was raised to its current status by Pope John XXIII by the Bull "Sicut provido" in 1962.

It is under the pastoral responsibility of the Bishop Tarcisius Isao Kikuchi.

See also
Roman Catholicism in Japan
Christ the King Cathedral

References

Roman Catholic cathedrals in Japan
Buildings and structures in Niigata (city)
Roman Catholic churches completed in 1927
20th-century Roman Catholic church buildings in Japan